Petaling Jaya is a federal constituency in Petaling District, Selangor, Malaysia, that was represented in the Dewan Rakyat from 1986 to 1995 and 2018 to present.

The federal constituency was created in the 1984 redistribution and is mandated to return a single member to the Dewan Rakyat under the first past the post voting system.

Demographics

History
It was abolished in 1995 when it was redistributed but re-created in 2018 redelineation exercise.

Polling districts
According to the federal gazette issued on 31 October 2022, the Petaling Jaya constituency is divided into 44 polling districts.

Representation history

State constituency

Current state assembly members

Local governments

Election results

References

Selangor federal constituencies
1984 establishments in Malaysia